Modern age is a period of history.

Modern age may also refer to:
 Modern Age (periodical), an American conservative academic quarterly journal
 The Modern Age of Comic Books, beginning in the mid-1980s
 The Modern Age, 2001 EP by The Strokes
 The Modern Age, 2019 album by Sleeper
 "The Modern Age", song by The Strokes from the album Is This It

See also
 New Age (disambiguation)